The Praja Paksham is a Telugu daily newspaper published in Telangana, India. It is the official organ of the Telangana State Council of the Communist Party of India.   K. Sreenivas Reddy is the editor of Praja Paksham.

References

Communist periodicals published in India
Newspapers published in India by city
Communist Party of India
Communist newspapers